Sofia shooting is a mass shooting that occurred on December 25, 1974, at Sofia, Bulgaria.

Background
On December 25, 1974, Branimir Donchev and two classmates watched the film "The Godfather" in the cinema. The film made a strong impression on Branimir and his friends with its tension, murders and blood. At 13:30 the screening of the film ended. After the film is shown, Branimir and a friend go home. After the film was shown, he became paranoid. It seemed to them that someone was watching them. They changed to different trams, walked, hid in the streets. Branimir later said that there were people watching in the movies and it seemed to them that someone was watching them. When he returned home, he found his brother and cousin there. His cousin was adopted by his aunt and they were not blood relatives. She was a first-year chemistry student at Sofia University. Branimir loved her, but did not receive reciprocity. Out of jealousy for his cousin, a fight broke out between the brothers. Branimir beat his brother because he was much physically stronger than him. The cousin rushed to take them apart, then cried and went to her dormitory. From his house he took a .380 Walther PP  pistol, a magazine with 7 rounds of ammunition, three boxes with 75 rounds of ammunition and a Finnish knife. It all belonged to his father. With this Branimir and his friend went to a friend's house. In a friend's house, they play with a gun, recreating scenes from a movie. Branimir also trained with a pistol in front of a mirror, lay down under the bed, did dry training in ambush shooting. Taking a weapon with him, at about 7 pm he went to his cousin's dormitory. She lived in block number 1 of the Student City of Sofia. He later said that he thought she was betraying him there and that there were enemies of "the government of our people" near her. His route to the dormitory was quite difficult, he changed buses, hid, believed that he was being watched and persecuted. He often visited his cousin's dormitory. She lived in room 410 on the fourth floor.

Attack
He went to his cousin's room but did not find her there. He found an unknown male and went with him to another room. The shooting started at 20:45. He broke into room number 519. It was celebrating the birthday of a student from Vietnam. There was a birthday boy and two more people. He insulted and humiliated those present, then shot those present. In this room, he killed one person on the spot and wounded two others. One of the wounded died at the hospital on December 28. He left the room and shot people in the corridors. He first shot at his victims and then stabbed them. When no people were left in the corridors, he knocked on the room door and shot people in the rooms. In one of the cinemas, a young couple was expecting a child. A man who tried to protect his wife, Branimir, killed her husband and a pregnant woman. Two students disarmed and subdued Branimir. During this time, the attacker seriously injured them, and one of them later died in hospital. After that, the attacker was taken to a small room, where he shouted that he was a special agent performing a secret task. He also said that there was another shooter in the dormitory. Branimir fired 26 shots. Six died at the scene, two more were in the hospital, and another eight were injured. One of the killed and three wounded were foreign nationals. He was arrested.

Perpetrator
Branimir Donchev Delchev (Бранимир Дончев Делчев) was born on October 4, 1957. He was of the highest class, lived in the central part of Sofia, he had everything he wanted. His father was the Deputy General Director of DSO "Stara Planina". Because of work, he traveled abroad a lot and spent little time with children. His mother was a cyclophenic or schizophrenic and was often treated in hospital for this. In 1971, she hanged herself in the attic of the family home. He had a twin brother and an older sister. He was mentally unstable and had a mental illness. He was greatly influenced by everything he saw. According to friends, he did not like Asians.

Aftermath
Immediately after the arrest, the house where Branimir lived was searched. The brother and sister were examined by psychiatrists. His brother was diagnosed with a mental illness. His father was sentenced to 4 years in prison for negligent possession of a weapon. He was also accused of having children with a mentally ill wife. After serving his sentence, he paid a large fine. His fate after that is unknown. His brother was in mental hospitals all the time. His mental problems were getting worse all the time and the authorities were afraid that he would repeat his brother's deed. In 1988, his sister received word that he had fallen from the terrace of the sanatorium and died on the spot.
Branimir underwent five forensic examinations. In conclusion, it was said that he had "schizophrenic psychosis." He was found insane and could not be held responsible. He was prescribed compulsory psychiatric treatment and placed in a psychiatric hospital in Lovech. On February 7, 1975, Branimir Donchev was taken to a psychiatric hospital. He asked to go to the toilet near the town of Pravets and the car stopped. Branimir tried to escape and was shot. He was secretly buried in an unnamed grave in Botevgrad. The Godfather's showing was limited, and bloody scenes were censored.

References

Murder in Sofia
1974 mass shootings in Europe
School shootings in Europe
1974 in Bulgaria
December 1974 events in Europe
1974 murders in Bulgaria
Deaths by firearm in Bulgaria
Mass shootings in Bulgaria
Stabbing attacks in Europe